The 1972 West Virginia Mountaineers football team represented West Virginia University in the 1972 NCAA University Division football season. It was the Mountaineers' 80th overall season and they competed as an independent. The team was led by head coach Bobby Bowden, in his third year, and played their home games at Mountaineer Field in Morgantown, West Virginia. They finished the season with a record of 8–4 with a loss against NC State in the Peach Bowl.

Schedule

Roster

References

West Virginia
West Virginia Mountaineers football seasons
West Virginia Mountaineers football